B&b, de boca en boca is a Spanish workplace comedy-drama television series created by Daniel Écija that originally aired from February 2014 to December 2015 on Telecinco. It stars Belén Rueda, Gonzalo de Castro, Carlos Iglesias, Dani Rovira, Macarena García, Fran Perea and Andrés Velencoso, among others.

Premise 
The fiction, a dramedy, is centered on the work taking place in a fashion magazine.

Cast 
 Belén Rueda as Candela.
 Gonzalo de Castro as Pablo.
 Macarena García as Sonia.
 Carlos Iglesias as César.
 Dani Rovira as Juan.
 Luisa Martín as Carmen.
 Fran Perea as Mario.
  as Susana.
 Paula Prendes as Martina.
  as Óscar Bornay.
  as Vero.
 Cristina Alarcón as Clara.
 Jorge Usón as Lucas.
 Sara Sálamo as Caye.
  as Hugo.
 Puchi Lagarde as Tita.
 Andrés Velencoso as Rubén Barahona.
  as Julián.
Introduced in season 2
  as Cristóbal.
 Elena Ballesteros as Maite.

Production and release 
Created by Daniel Écija, Écija was also credited as executive producer. The series debuted on Telecinco on 17 February 2014, facing Velvet as prime time rival. The last episode of the first season aired on 11 June 2014. 15 months later, the series returned on 16 September 2015 with a new season. Receiving a waning interest from the audience, the broadcasting run ended on 30 December 2015; the season finale earned the lowest share throughout the series (9.5%).

Awards and nominations 

|-
| align = "center" | 2015 || 55th Monte-Carlo Television Festival || Best Comedy Actress || Belén Rueda ||  || 
|}

References 

Spanish-language television shows
Telecinco network series
Television series about journalism
2010s workplace drama television series
2010s workplace comedy television series
2010s Spanish comedy television series
2010s Spanish drama television series
2014 Spanish television series debuts
2015 Spanish television series endings
Spanish comedy-drama television series
Television series by Globomedia